Aethiopia is a genus of beetles in the family Cerambycidae, containing the following species:

 Aethiopia elongata Aurivillius, 1911
 Aethiopia lesnei Breuning, 1948
 Aethiopia lineolata Breuning, 1939
 Aethiopia paratanganjicae Breuning, 1971
 Aethiopia rufescens Aurivillius, 1913
 Aethiopia tanganjicae Breuning, 1964

References

Apomecynini
Cerambycidae genera